The following games were initially announced as Nintendo 64 and 64DD titles, however were subsequently cancelled or postponed indefinitely by developers or publishers.

References

 
 
Nintendo 64 games
Nintendo 64